The 5th constituency of Réunion is a French legislative constituency on the island of Réunion. As of 2022, it is represented by Jean-Hugues Ratenon, a Rézistans Égalité 974 deputy.

Deputies

Election results

2022

2017

2012

Sources

 French Interior Ministry results website: 

5